The Immaculate Heart of Mary Church is a historic Roman Catholic church in northern Pulaski County, Arkansas.  It is located off Arkansas Highway 365 on Blue Hill (Jasna Gora) in Marche, north of North Little Rock.

History

In 1878, Father Anthony Jaworski, a Polish priest from the Holy Ghost Fathers came to Marche. He led the efforts to establish a parish and build the first church. The first structure was a small wooden chapel built on a large hill. The new parish was named the Immaculate Heart of Mary and the hill was named Jasna Gora or "Blue Hill" after the shrine in Poland. In 1896, a larger church was built and served the parish until it was destroyed by fire. It was replaced by the current church building in 1932.

The current church building is a Gothic Revival structure, built out of brick on a stone foundation.  It was designed by the noted Arkansas architect Charles L. Thompson, and was completed in 1932.

The church building was listed on the National Register of Historic Places in 1982.

See also
Immaculate Heart of Mary School (Marche, Arkansas)
National Register of Historic Places listings in Pulaski County, Arkansas

References

Churches in the Roman Catholic Diocese of Little Rock
Churches on the National Register of Historic Places in Arkansas
Gothic Revival church buildings in Arkansas
Roman Catholic churches completed in 1932
Churches in Pulaski County, Arkansas
National Register of Historic Places in Pulaski County, Arkansas
20th-century Roman Catholic church buildings in the United States